The Directorate of Navigation and Tactical Control (Naval) was a directorate  of the Navy Department, Naval Staff  first established in 1912 as the Navigation Department of Hydrographic Department of the Admiralty.  In 1945 it was renamed the Navigation Division and assigned to the Admiralty Naval Staff. In 1946 it was re designated Navigation and Direction Division until 1966 and now part of the Navy Department Naval Staff it was renamed the Directorate of Navigation and Tactical Control (Naval). The staff directorate was administered by the Director Navigation Tactical Control (Naval) who reported to the Assistant Chief of the Naval Staff (Warfare) it existed until 1968.

History
The directorate was originally established in December 1912 as the Navigation Department of the Admiralty then part of the department of the Hydrographer of the Navy. Following changes in the command structure of the Admiralty Naval Staff (1917-1919) the department and thus Director of Navigation came under direct control of the First Sea Lord until 1945. In July the Navigation Department was renamed the Navigation Division and now as part of the Naval Staff. In 1946 it was renamed the Navigation and Direction Division.  The division existed as part of the Admiralty Naval Staff until April 1964 when the Admiralty was combined to created single new Ministry of Defence it continued following the merger as part of the Naval Staff, Navy Department until 1966 when it was renamed the Directorate of Navigation and Tactical Control (Naval) In June 1968 the Directorate was abolished.

Head of department/division/directorate

Director of Navigation Department
Included:
 Captain Philip Nelson-Ward: December 1912-August 1916
 Captain John A. Webster: August 1916-August 1919
 Captain John E.T.Harper: August 1919-November 1921
 Captain Frederick P.Loder Symonds: November 1921-November 1923
 Captain the Hon.Arthur C.Strutt: November 1923-November 1925
 Captain Alfred H.Norman: November 1925-November 1927
 Captain Oswald H. Dawson: November 1927-January 1930
 Captain Kenelm E. L. Creighton: January 1930-December 1931
 Captain James D. Campbell: December 1931-September 1933
 Captain John W.Clayton: September 1933-September 1935
 Captain William G. Benn: September 1935-June 1938
 Captain Charles E. Morgan: June 1938-October 1940
 Captain Ronald G. Bowes-Lyon: October 1940-June 1942
 Rear-Admiral William G. Benn: June 1942 – 1944 (continued till December 1945 as Head of Navigation Division)

Director of Navigation Division
Included:
 Rear-Admiral William G. Benn: 1944-December 1945
 Captain Richard W. Ravenhill: December 1945-December 1947

Director of Navigation and Direction Division
Included:
 Captain Richard W. Ravenhill: 1946-December 1947
 Captain Francis B. Lloyd: December 1947-December 1949
 Captain Wilfred G. Brittain: December 1949-December 1951
 Captain Earle H. Thomas: December 1951-January 1954
 Captain Maurice E. Butler-Bowden: January 1954-December 1956
 Captain John E. Jowitt: December 1956-October 1958
 Captain Donald McEwen: October 1958-January 1961
 Captain Colin D. Madden: January 1961-March 1962
 Captain John W.H. Bennett: March 1962-June 1964
 Captain David N. Forbes: June 1964-December 1965
 Captain John S. Le Blanc Smith: December 1965 – 1966

Director of Navigation and Tactical Control (Naval)
Included:
 Captain John S. Le Blanc Smith: 1966-1968

References

Naval Staff Directorates of the Ministry of Defence (United Kingdom)
Military units and formations established in 1966
Military units and formations disestablished in 1968